Jo Frost: Nanny On Tour is an American short-lived reality television series, themed around parenting skills, hosted by British nanny Jo Frost.  The series ran for 10 1-hour long episodes from January to March 2016 on Up TV. Jo Frost also serves as a producer on the show.

Background 
The series uses a similar theme that was used in Supernanny, which has Frost traveling to a new city each week and work with one family that desperately needs her expertise. Prior to her arrival, Frost monitors the family's behavior from her mobile RV office through the use of surveillance cameras through the consent of the family after they agree to have it placed throughout their home. Once she sees their weaknesses and errors, Frost helps the families come up with tools and techniques in order to improve their parenting skills, maintain their discipline and relationship with their children, and to keep in touch through progress reports. In addition, Frost also travels to communities where she seeks out help from people looking for advice from family issues to becoming better parents.

Production 
The series' format was based on a Dutch version that Frost did for RTL 4 in 2015. The concept was later picked up by Up TV in September 2015.

Frost also wanted to move away from the Supernanny image by adopting a contemporary look: "It was really important to be able to think what kind of format I can develop to allow me to be the staple in a family's home," Frost said, "and be able to look at a wider spectrum of issues we see in 21st century modern parenting."

Episodes 

(This section is unfinished, you can help finish it by finding more details about these Episodes and edit their descriptions)

International broadcast 
In the United Kingdom, the series aired on Quest Red in March 2017.

References

External links 
  (UPtv)
 

2010s American reality television series
2016 American television series debuts
2016 American television series endings
English-language television shows
American television series based on Dutch television series
Parenting television series
Works about child care occupations